Bahareh Afshari (Persian: بهاره افشاری, born July 23, 1984) is an Iranian actress. She is best known for her role in She Was An Angel (2005). She earned a Hafez Award nomination for her performance in Distances (2010).

Filmography

Film

Web

Awards and nominations

References 

Iranian costume designers
1984 births
Iranian film actresses
Iranian television actresses
Iranian stage actresses
People from Ray, Iran
Living people

External links